Valea Ursului may refer to several places in Romania:

Valea Ursului, a commune in Neamț County
 Valea Ursului, a village in Bascov Commune, Argeș County
 Valea Ursului, a village in Mânzălești Commune, Buzău County
 Valea Ursului, a village in Miroslava Commune, Iași County
 Valea Ursului, a village in Ponoarele Commune, Mehedinți County
 Valea Ursului, a village in Tâmna Commune, Mehedinți County
 Valea Ursului, a village in Fârtățești Commune, Vâlcea County

See also 
 Valea Ursului River (disambiguation)
 Urs (disambiguation)
 Ursu (surname)
 Valea (disambiguation)